The 2020–21 New Hampshire Wildcats men's basketball team represented the University of New Hampshire in the 2020–21 NCAA Division I men's basketball season. They played their home games at the Lundholm Gym in Durham, New Hampshire and were led by 16th-year head coach Bill Herrion. In a season limited due to the ongoing COVID-19 pandemic, the Wildcats finished the season 10–9, 9–6 in America East play to finish in third place. They lost in the quarterfinals of the America East tournament to UMass Lowell.

Previous season
The Wildcats finished the 2019–20 season 15–15, 8–8 in America East play to finish in a tie for fourth place. They lost in the quarterfinals of the America East tournament to UMBC.

Roster

Schedule and results

|-
!colspan=12 style=| Regular season

|-
!colspan=12 style=| America East tournament
|-

|-

Source

References

New Hampshire Wildcats men's basketball seasons
New Hampshire Wildcats
New Hampshire Wildcats men's basketball
New Hampshire Wildcats men's basketball